Oyibo Ugbo is one of the villages in Ugbo town in the Awgu local government area of Enugu State, Nigeria.

Oyibo Ugbo is bounded by their Ngene Ugbo and Ugbo Okpala kins, Obeagu, Ogwugwu, and Mmaku. Although still not categorized as a village by other villages that make up the town, owing to the fact that they [oyibo ugbo]are not direct descendant of ogulugu the progenitor of Ugbo people. Oyibo is socially, culturally, politically, and religiously under ngene ugbo autonomous community, but still maintain their ancestral tie with their Ugbo Okpala kins which is seen during the Aju Festival [Iwa Akwa], when the Ugbo Okpala people had to join their Oyibo kin to perform Iwa Akwa, their ancient festival.

History
Oyibo Ugbo migrated to their present location from Ugbo Okpala centuries ago during a land dispute between the ugbo okpala people and mmaku people. according to stories, mmaku people were encroaching in their land, to prevent them from taking over, the community agreed that the oldest kindred should relocate to the disputed land to prevent Mmaku people from coming any further. Although the decision for them to leave their ancestral home and relocate to a land where they will be secluded from the rest of the people weren't accepted by them, but knowing what is at stake, they had to embark on the journey to protect their territory. Some of the affected kindred relocated while some stayed behind, the ones that stayed behind are Umu Onaga people of Ugbo Okpala, while the ones that relocated crossed Oji and journeyed through the hills and valleys of the town and made their way to the land. When they reached their destination they settled in different part of the land. Some settled at a place called Obodo Umuaho, while some settled at nwaogboezi/ebeadu in ogba-agbo, and the rest settled at obodo egbo. from this places the Oyibo Ugbo settled when they first came to the land which is now called Ndiuno, they spreed to other parts of the land. today Oyibo Ugbo is a village with four kindred namely umu nakwa, ama ugwu, umu ogene, and umu aba.

Notable Indigens Of The Community
 Chief Simeon chukwunta
 Chief James Okafor
 Chief John Chukwu 
 Josephat Ani
 Barr Tobias Ani
 Mr Thomas Chime
 Engr Pius Chukwunta

Populated places in Enugu State